Max Susan Wozniak  (born September 22, 1926) is a German-born Polish-American former soccer goalkeeper and manager who was briefly head coach of the United States men's national soccer team. 

Wozniak was born in Cologne on September 22, 1926.

Wozniak played in Victoria Świebodzice (1946–52), Górnik Wałbrzych (1952–56), Maccabi Jaffa (1956), Hapoel Kfar Saba (1957–59) and one match in Israel national football team.

In 1967, he coached the Los Angeles Toros of the National Professional Soccer League. After leading Maccabee Los Angeles to victory in the 1973 National Challenge Cup, Wozniak became head coach of the U.S. national team. He was in charge for two games, losing both. Future national team head coach Walter Chyzowych was his assistant.

In 1993 he was inducted into the Southern California Jewish Sports Hall of Fame.

References

1926 births
Living people
American soccer coaches
Polish footballers
Polish football managers
National Professional Soccer League (1967) coaches
North American Soccer League (1968–1984) coaches
United States men's national soccer team managers
Footballers from Cologne
Association football goalkeepers
German footballers needing infoboxes
Polish expatriate sportspeople in the United States
Polish expatriate football managers
Expatriate soccer managers in the United States